Krishnamachari Bharatan (born 5 January 1963) is an Indian former first-class cricketer. He is now an umpire and has stood in matches in the 2015–16 Ranji Trophy.

References

External links
 

1963 births
Living people
Indian cricketers
Indian cricket umpires
Railways cricketers
Cricketers from Chennai